Thesprotia brevis is a species of mantis found in Paraguay.

References

brevis
Fauna of Paraguay
Insects of South America
Insects described in 1915